Ficalhoa is a genus with only one species, Ficalhoa laurifolia, an evergreen flowering tree of  height with glabrous branches. Its bark is roughly fissured and produces white latex. Its white, yellowish or greenish flowers have oblong small petals and rounded sepals.

In Virunga National Park it grows in Afromontane forest between  altitude.

References

Plants described in 1898
Afromontane flora
Flora of West-Central Tropical Africa
Flora of the Democratic Republic of the Congo
Sladeniaceae
Monotypic Ericales genera